Ceriale (locally ) is a comune (municipality) in the Province of Savona in the Italian region of Liguria, located about  southwest of Genoa and about  southwest of Savona.

Ceriale borders the following municipalities: Albenga, Balestrino, Borghetto Santo Spirito, Cisano sul Neva, and Toirano.

Geography

History 
The village, an  territorial dominion of the bishop of Albenga since the early Middle Ages, was acquired in the 14th century by the Republic of Genoa.
In that period  the nearby village of Capriolo was abandoned, according to local sources, as a result of an invasion of ants.
Following the frequent raids by Saracens on the Ligurian coast, a circular bastion was built adjacent to the beach in 1563; however, the town was again attacked and sackrf by Barbary pirates in 1637.

Along with other towns of the Ligurian Riviera, in 1764 Ceriale participated in an uprising against the Republic of Genoa, caused by the heavy tax burden.
It   became part of the Kingdom of Sardinia in 1815, after the fall of Napoleon Bonaparte; and, in 1861, of the Kingdom of Italy.
From 1973 until 31 December 2008 Ceriale was part of Ingauna Mountain Community, which was terminated by the Liguria Regional Law Number 23, 29 December 2010.

Main sights

Religious architecture
 Parish Church of Saints John the Baptist and Eugene. It houses a 16th century crucifix and also numerous blades dating from the 16th and 17th centuries.
 Church of Peagna. Adjacent to the cemetery, it is flanked by a tower built in  Baroque style and internally is home to paintings from the 15th and 16th centuries.

Amusement parks
 Water Park: The Caravelle

Culture

Museums
 The Paleontological Museum Silvio Lai: It was founded in 1993 in the hamlet of Peagna. The museum exhibits the collection of municipal fossil from the nearby Regional Natural Reserve of Rio Torsero, dating back to Pliocene lower (5.3000000 to 3.6000000 of years ago). The museum has a conference room, a laboratory and a small library.

Events
 Feast of San Rocco (16  August)

International relations

Ceriale is twinned with:
 Sucha Beskidzka, Poland

Economy
The town's  main economic resources are tourism and   agriculture. Vegetables and flowers are cultivated, in particular  orchids grown in greenhouses. Industries include  shipyards and  confectionery plants.

References

External links
 Official website

Cities and towns in Liguria